Cyana tricolora is a moth of the family Erebidae. It was described by Arthur Gardiner Butler in 1877. It is found in New Guinea.

References

Cyana
Moths described in 1877